James B. Corbett (born February 22, 1955) is a former American football tight end who played four seasons with the Cincinnati Bengals of the National Football League (NFL). He was drafted by the Cincinnati Bengals in the seventh round of the 1977 NFL Draft. He played college football at the University of Pittsburgh and attended McDowell High School in Millcreek Township, Erie County, Pennsylvania.

References

External links
Just Sports Stats
College stats

Living people
1955 births
Players of American football from Massachusetts
American football tight ends
Pittsburgh Panthers football players
Cincinnati Bengals players
Sportspeople from Brockton, Massachusetts